This is a list of MPs that lost their seat at the 2019 Canadian federal election.

Composition 
The region with the most defeated MPs was the Fraser Valley of British Columbia, win which 5 Liberal MPs were defeated by Conservative candidates.

List of MPs

References 

2019 Canadian federal election
Lists of Canadian MPs who were defeated by election